The Ashton Moss transmitting stations are two independent facilities for medium wave broadcasting near Ashton Moss, an area of Tameside in Greater Manchester.

Original BBC station 

Originally constructed by the BBC for its local radio service, BBC Radio Manchester, located at 

The facility has, since 1994, been used for transmitting Gold on 1458 kHz with a power of 5 kW.
It consists of 3 free-standing lattice towers, arranged as a directional array, insulated against ground.

It is one of the few broadcasting stations in Europe using free-standing tower radiators.

It is designated "Ashton Moss (West) MF" by owners Arqiva

Original IBA station 

Originally constructed in 1974 for the IBA for its local radio contractor, Piccadilly Radio, located at 

This facility was used for transmitting Greatest Hits Manchester on 1152 kHz. It uses a directional antenna consisting of 4 guyed masts, insulated against ground. This antenna has a maximum output toward 250°. In this direction the ERP is 1.5 kW, whereby the transmitter output is 350 Watts.

The antenna of this transmitter has therefore a highly directional pattern, in order not to interfere with other nearby transmitters on the same frequency.

The 1152 kHz service ceased operation on the 26th April 2021, following the service becoming available on 96.2 MHz FM in the local area.

Additionally, Asian Sound operates from this site on 1377 kHz

It is designated "Ashton Moss (East) MF" by owners Arqiva

Arqiva
The stations were constructed and owned by the BBC and IBA as indicated above. Over time, (1974-2007), by a series of asset sell offs, and mergers, both sites are now owned and operated by Arqiva

Analogue radio services available

References

External links
 Former BBC owned mast at Ashton Moss: entry at mb21
   .. and its location (NGR: SJ915985)
 Former IBA owned mast at Ashton Moss: entry at mb21
   .. and its location (NGR: SJ925994)

Transmitter sites in England